Twthill is a Norman castle located near the town of Rhuddlan, Denbighshire in Wales; historic names for the site include Toothill and Tot Hill Castle and it is also known as Old Rhuddlan Castle. It is a motte-and-bailey castle and was later replaced by the much larger, stone-built Rhuddlan Castle. The only remaining visible signs of the old castle are the large mound of the motte, and traces of the wall that surrounded the bailey.

History

Twthill castle was built to a 'motte and bailey' design and was erected by Robert of Rhuddlan in 1073. He was a kinsman of Hugh d'Avranches, Earl of Chester and the castle was designed to consolidate Norman advances into the north of Wales at the command of William the Conqueror. Using this castle as a base, Robert subdued the Welsh and established control of much of North Wales. A borough became established beside the castle and by 1086, eighteen burgesses enjoying special privileges lived here, and the buildings included a church and a mint. Coins minted at Rhuddlan between this date and 1215 can be found in museum collections.

The motte and bailey castle remained in use for two hundred years until Rhuddlan Castle was built adjacent to the site, on the orders of Edward I. Tradition has it that Twthill Castle was built on the site of the palace of Gruffydd ap Llywelyn, king of Wales.

Preservation
Twthill is located some 300 yards south of the later, stone-built Rhuddlan Castle. Only the motte mound of the old castle remains today, standing 12 metres high with a maximum diameter of 80 metres, although impressions of the bailey can be seen in the surrounding fields. Much of the site has degraded due to the sandy soil conditions./

Twthill is currently in the care of Cadw and is open to the public all year round. Admission is free and the castle is accessed via a 400-metre public footpath across agricultural land.

References

See also
Castles in Great Britain and Ireland
List of castles in Wales

Castles in Denbighshire
Castle ruins in Wales
Cadw
Rhuddlan